Dennis P. Hession (born 1950, Salt Lake City, Utah) is an American attorney and adjunct professor of law at Gonzaga University School of Law, who was appointed mayor of Spokane, Washington for nearly two years. He became mayor pro tem on December 16, 2005, when a special election to recall Mayor James E. West was certified (West having been recalled after involvement in a sex scandal). 

Hession was officially appointed mayor by the City Council on January 3, 2006, to serve the remainder of West's term in office. He unsuccessfully sought election to the appointed position, conceding the election to city council member, Mary Verner, on the evening of November 9, 2007.
Prior to becoming mayor pro tem he had served for four years on the Spokane City Council. In 2004 he was elected City Council President.

References

Mayors of Spokane, Washington
Living people
1950 births